The first RMS Windsor Castle, along with her sister, was an ocean liner laid down by the Union-Castle Line for service from the United Kingdom to South Africa. During World War 2 the Windsor Castle was requisitioned as a troopship and on 23 March 1943 was sunk by an aerial torpedo off the coast of Algeria.

History

Construction and design
Originally designed for the Union-Castle Line in 1913, she was ordered from Harland & Wolff but her construction was held up by the First World War. The continuation of the war until late 1918 led Harland & Wolff to subcontract her building to John Brown & Company. Windsor Castle was not completed until 1922. The two ships were the only four-stacked ocean liners built and design for a route other than the transatlantic crossing. She had a capacity of 234 first, 362 second, and 274 third-class passengers. The liner had two masts and two propellers and could reach a top speed of 18 knots.

Ocean Liner Career
Windsor Castle set out on her maiden voyage from Southampton to Cape Town in April 1922. This gave the Union-Castle Line the two largest ships on that run to provide an alternating service between England and South Africa. And apart from the comforts, the ship had also been designed with safety in mind. The hull was subdivided into twelve watertight compartments and a double bottom. Furthermore, Windsor Castle was equipped with many lifeboats, with room for the ship’s total capacity of passengers. Just aft of the fourth funnel, the ship had a pair of gantry davits (like those carried on ) alone capable of handling twelve boats.

1930s refit

During the 1930s, Windsor and Arundel were given refits to make them look more modern. This included reducing their funnels from four to two, with new Babcock-Johnson boilers, and they both were given raked, more modern bows, which slightly increased their length.

World War 2 and Sinking
Requisitioned as a troop transport in the Second World War, she was bombed west of Ireland in 1941 but the bomb never exploded and she reached port. She was used for transatlantic trooping from Canada and the USA in 1942. in 1943, Windsor Castle was sunk by a torpedo launched from a German aircraft while in the Mediterranean Sea as part of convoy KMF-11. She was hit by the torpedo at 2:30 am but did not sink until 5:25 pm, stern first,  WNW of Algiers, Algeria.

References

External links

 MaritimeQuest RMS Windsor Castle pages
 

 

Ocean liners
Four funnel liners
Ships sunk by German aircraft
Ships of the Union-Castle Line
1921 ships
Maritime incidents in March 1943
World War II shipwrecks in the Mediterranean Sea